Malaxis porphyrea, the Cochise adder's-mouth orchid,  is a species of orchid native to northern Mexico (Sonora, Chihuahua) and the southwestern United States (Arizona, New Mexico).

References

Orchids of Mexico
Flora of the Southwestern United States
Plants described in 1883
porphyrea